Titanoceros vinotinctalis is a species of snout moth. It is found in China.

References

Moths described in 1927
Epipaschiinae